Ali Saleh Al-Jadani (born 30 May 1977) is a Saudi Arabian athlete. He competed in the men's javelin throw at the 2000 Summer Olympics.

References

1977 births
Living people
Athletes (track and field) at the 2000 Summer Olympics
Saudi Arabian male javelin throwers
Olympic athletes of Saudi Arabia
Place of birth missing (living people)